Coptotriche insolita is a moth of the family Tischeriidae. It was described by Annette Frances Braun in 1972. It is found in the US state of New Jersey.

The larvae feed on Vaccinium corymbosum. They mine the leaves of their host plant.

References

Moths described in 1972
Tischeriidae